Encore is an album led by jazz trombonist Eddie Bert recorded in 1955 and first released on the Savoy label.

Reception

The Allmusic review by Scott Yanow stated: "Trombonist Eddie Bert has had a long and honorable musical career but relatively few opportunities to record as a leader. He is heard in two different settings ... with a pianoless quartet that includes guitarist Joe Puma and with a quintet that includes pianist Hank Jones and the complementary tenor of J.R. Monterose. The repertoire consists entirely of originals by either Bert or Puma but the style is very much of the era: cool-toned and lightly swinging bop. ... the music is worth exploring".

Track listing
All compositions by Eddie Bert, except where indicated.
 "Bert Tram" –	3:05
 "One for Tubby" (Joe Puma) – 5:25
 "It's Only Sunshine" (Puma) – 3:12
 "Opicana" (Puma) – 3:23
 "Conversation" – 6:45
 "Crosstown" – 7:15
 "Manhattan Suite" – 5:43
Recorded at Van Gelder Studio, Hackensack, NJ on June 22 (tracks 1-4) & September 1 (tracks 5-7), 1955

Personnel
Eddie Bert – trombone 
Joe Puma – guitar (tracks 1-4)
J. R. Monterose – tenor saxophone (tracks 5-7)
Hank Jones – piano (tracks 5-7)
Clyde Lombardi – bass 
Kenny Clarke – drums

References

Savoy Records albums
Eddie Bert albums
1955 albums
Albums produced by Ozzie Cadena
Albums recorded at Van Gelder Studio